Soured milk denotes a range of food products produced by the acidification of milk. Acidification, which gives the milk a tart taste, is achieved either through bacterial fermentation or through the addition of an acid, such as lemon juice or vinegar. The acid causes milk to coagulate and thicken, inhibiting the growth of harmful bacteria and improving the product's shelf life.

Soured milk that is produced by bacterial fermentation is more specifically called fermented milk or cultured milk. Traditionally, soured milk was simply fresh milk that was left to ferment and sour by keeping it in a warm place for a day, often near a stove. Modern commercial soured milk may differ from milk that has become sour naturally.

Soured milk that is produced by the addition of an acid, with or without the addition of microbial organisms, is more specifically called acidified milk.  In the United States, acids used to manufacture acidified milk include acetic acid (commonly found in vinegar), adipic acid, citric acid (commonly found in lemon juice), fumaric acid, glucono-delta-lactone, hydrochloric acid, lactic acid, malic acid, phosphoric acid, succinic acid, and tartaric acid.

Soured milk is commonly made at home or is sold and consumed in Europe, especially in Eastern Europe (Bulgaria, Belarus, Poland, Russia, Ukraine, Lithuania), all over the countries of the former Yugoslavia (Macedonia, Serbia, Montenegro, Bosnia and Herzegovina, Croatia, Slovenia), Romania, Hungary, Greece, Finland, Germany, Scandinavia and Slovakia.

It is also made at home or sold in supermarkets and consumed in the Great Lakes region of Somalia and  Eastern Africa (Kenya, Uganda, Rwanda, Burundi and Tanzania).  It is also a traditional food of the Bantu people of Southern Africa.

Since the 1970s, some producers have used chemical acidification in place of biological agents.

In recipes 
Raw milk that has not gone sour is sometimes referred to as "sweet milk", because it contains the sugar lactose. Fermentation converts the lactose to lactic acid, which has a sour flavor. Before the invention of refrigeration, raw milk commonly became sour before it could be consumed, and various recipes incorporate such leftover milk as an ingredient. Sour milk produced by fermentation differs in flavor from that produced by acidification, because the acids commonly added in commercial manufacture have different flavors from lactic acid, and also because fermentation can introduce new flavors.  Buttermilk is a common modern substitute for naturally soured milk.

See also

References 

Fermented dairy products
Russian drinks
Russian dairy products